Cyril Christo (born 11 May 1960) is a writer, photographer, filmmaker, trust funder and animal rights activist residing in Santa Fe, New Mexico. He is the son of Christo Vladimirov Javacheff and Jeanne-Claude Denat de Guillebon, who are known as the artists Christo and Jeanne-Claude.

Early life and education 
Born in France, he has lived in the United States since 1964. Christo studied at Cornell University and graduated from Columbia University in 1982.

Film work
Together with his wife Mary Wilkinson he has been engaged since 1996 in wildlife documentary projects and has published several photography books about Africa that call attention to endangered animals such as elephants, leopards, giraffes, and lions
as well as appeals for more stricter measures to enforce the protection of whales and polar bears.

Their son Lysander (born 22 September 2005) has participated in their projects in East Africa from an early age. In 2007 they released a short documentary film titled "Lysander's Song" about the interactions between humans and elephants.

Cyril Christo is the co-producer of A Stitch for Time: The Boise Peace Quilt Project, which was nominated in 1998 for an Academy Award for Best Documentary Feature. The film documents activities of a group of quilt makers in Boise, Idaho, who received international attention for promoting peace by sending a quilt in 1981 to the Soviet Union as well as making the National Peace Quilt in 1986 for display in the United States Senate and later deposit at the Smithsonian Institution.
 

The film Walking Thunder: Ode to the African Elephant about Lysander's encounter with elephants in East Africa was screened at the 2019 Taos Environmental Film Festival.

Publications
 1990: The dream of the Earth. E. Mellen Press, Lewiston.  
 1998: The whispering veils : Poems on Christo's art. Hugh Lauter Levin Associates, New York. 
 2004: Lost Africa: Eyes of Origin. Photographs and text by Cyril Christo and Marie Wilkinson. Assouline, New York City. 
 2004: Africa : la terre des origines (in French) 
 2009: Walking Thunder: In the Footsteps of the African Elephant. Merrell, London  
 2013: In Predatory Light: Lions and Tigers and Polar Bears. Merrell, London  
 Forthcoming: Lords of the Earth: The entwined destiny  of  wildlife  and humanity, with a prologue by Jane Goodall

References

1960 births
Living people
American documentary filmmakers
American people of Bulgarian descent
American people of French descent
Nature photographers
People from Santa Fe, New Mexico

Columbia College (New York) alumni
American film producers